The Alaska Press Club is a network of journalists and media in Alaska. The club holds an annual journalism conference and awards banquet in Anchorage, Alaska, known as J-Week. The organization also awards scholarships to individuals. 

The club was incorporated in 1951. The club consists of several hundred members and is open to students and professional journalists in Alaska.

References

External links
 Official website
 Alaska Press Club 2015 Awards

1951 establishments in Alaska
Mass media in Alaska
Organizations established in 1951

501(c)(3) organizations
Non-profit organizations based in Alaska